Top Model, season 1 (or Top Model: New York) was the first season of Top Model. It was broadcast on TV3 in Denmark, Norway, and Sweden by Viasat from February to May 2005. The winner of the competition was 21-year-old Kine Bakke from Bergen. The runners-up were Elina Herbeck from Umeå and Nanna Schultz Christensen from Copenhagen.

Denmark's pre-selection
 Denmark's competition was hosted by Anne Pedersen, who was also the head judge until the three countries merged and Georgianna Robertson took over. The first episode was aired in Denmark on 15 February 2005 with the final episode being aired on 3 May. The first episode saw nine contestants selected for the competition.

The final three girls chosen to compete in the final competition with Norway and Sweden were Cecilie Madsen, Nanna Schultz Christensen and Stine Mangaard Hansen. The last contestant standing was Schultz Christensen, who was runner-up overall.

Contestants

(ages stated are at start of contest)

Final 9

Final 3

Call out order

  The contestant was eliminated at judging panel

Sweden's pre-selection
 Sweden's competition was hosted by Mini Andén, who was also the head judge until the three countries merged and Georgianna Robertson took over. The first episode was aired in Sweden on 16 February 2005 with the final episode being aired on 27 April. The first episode saw nine contestants selected for the competition.

The final three girls chosen to compete in the final competition with Denmark and Norway were Elina Herbeck, Madelene Lund and Maja Ekberg. The last contestant standing was Herbeck, who was runner-up overall.

Contestants

(ages stated are at start of contest)

Final 10

Final 3

Call out order

  The contestant was eliminated at judging panel
 The contestant quit the competition

Norway's pre-selection
 Norway's competition was hosted by Kathrine Sørland, who was also the head judge until the three countries merged and Georgianna Robertson took over. The first episode was aired in Norway on 17 February 2005 with the final episode being aired on 12 May.

The final three girls chosen to compete in the final competition with Denmark and Sweden were Henriette Stenbeck, Kine Bakke and Kristin Rem Trehjørningen. The last contestant standing was Bakke, who went on to win the competition.

Contestants

(ages stated are at start of contest)

Final 9

Final 3

Call out order

  The contestant was eliminated at judging panel

Photo shoot guide
Episode 1 photo shoot: Bikini on New York City street
Episode 2 photo shoot: Confinement
Episode 3 photo shoot: With animals
Episode 4 photo shoot: Madonna-style
Episode 5 photo shoot: Emotions
Episode 6 photo shoot: Pairs
Episode 7 photo shoot: Bikinis in Miami
Episode 8 photo shoot: Tour buses in NYC
Episode 9 photo shoot: Top Model covers
Episode 10 photo shoot: B&W with Marcus Schenkenberg

References

External links 
Official website of Top Model Danmark (archive at the Wayback Machine)
Official website of Top Model Sverige (archive at the Wayback Machine)
Official website of Top Model Norge (archive at the Wayback Machine)

Scandinavia
2005 Danish television seasons
2005 Norwegian television seasons
2005 Swedish television seasons